Acritocera negligens, the coconut spathe borer, is a moth of the family Cossidae. It is found on Fiji.

Adult females have dark reddish brown to almost black forewings, with the veins bordered by lighter streaks and an oblique cream line beyond the middle. The hindwings are pearly. Males are smaller than females and less dark.

The larvae feed on Cocos nucifera. They mainly feed on the male flowers. They are white or pinkish brown, with a yellow shield on the thorax.

References

Moths described in 1861
Endemic fauna of Fiji
Cossidae
Moths of Fiji